Mitchell Green is a professor of philosophy at the University of Connecticut, where he sits on the steering committee of the Cognitive Science program and the executive committee of the Graduate School. He is editor-in-chief of the journal Philosophia.

Research work
His research focuses on philosophy of language, philosophy of mind, aesthetics, and pragmatics. He made influential contributions to speech act theory, the evolutionary biology of communication, to the study of empathy, self-knowledge, self-expression and attitude ascription, and to the epistemology of fiction. His account of communication as self-expression,  develops the idea that communication is best understood as a tool for signalling and showing our internal mental states. Green's influential research has been celebrated by a special issue of the international journal Grazer Philosophische Studien, titled Sources of Meaning. Themes from Mitchell S. Green, edited by J. Michel, and by a special issue of the journal Organon Filozofia (vol. 28, 2021), titled The Origins of Meaning and the Nature of Speech Acts, edited by M. Witek.

Green previously held a professor position at the University of Virginia (from 1993 to 2013), and currently runs an MOOC at Coursera. He has held fellowships from the National Science Foundation, the National Humanities Center, the Center for Contemplative Mind in Society, and the American Council of Learned Societies. He has held visiting research positions at Singapore Management University (2008), the University of Muenster (2015), and was a Mercator Fellow at the Ruhr University Bochum, in the Emmy Noether Research Group (2020–21).

Publications

Books 
 The Philosophy of Language, Oxford University Press, 2021. 
 Know Thyself: The Value and Limits of Self-Knowledge Routledge, 2017. 
 Self-Expression, Oxford University Press, 2007 
 Engaging Philosophy: A Brief Introduction, Hackett Publishing Company, 2006. .
 Moore’s Paradox: New Essays on Belief, Rationality and the First Person, edited with John Williams, including eleven previously unpublished essays. Oxford University Press, 2007 );

Encyclopedia articles 
 'Speech Acts,’ in E. Zalta (ed.) The Stanford Encyclopedia of Philosophy. (Orig. 2007; revisions 2014.)

Highly cited articles 
 'Perceiving Emotions', Aristotelian Society Supplementary Volume 84 (2010), 45-61 https://doi.org/10.1111/j.1467-8349.2010.00185.x
 'Speech Acts, the Handicap Principle, and the Expression of Psychological States,’ Mind & Language 24 (2009): 139-163. https://doi.org/10.1111/j.1468-0017.2008.01357.x
 ‘Direct Reference, Empty Names, and Implicature,’ Canadian Journal of Philosophy 37 (2007): 419-48 http://dx.doi.org/10.1353/cjp.2007.0021
 ‘Illocutionary Force and Semantic Content,’ Linguistics & Philosophy, 23 (2000): 435-473. http://dx.doi.org/10.1023/A:1005642421177
 ‘Direct Reference and Implicature,’ Philosophical Studies, 91 (1998): 61-90 http://dx.doi.org/10.1023/A:1004212614842
 ‘Quantity, Volubility, and Some Varieties of Discourse,’ Linguistics & Philosophy, 18 (1995): 83-112. http://dx.doi.org/10.1007/BF00984962
 'Indeterminism and the thin red line' (with N. Belnap), Philosophical perspectives 8 (1994), 365-388 http://dx.doi.org/10.2307/2214178

References

External links 

20th-century American philosophers
21st-century American philosophers
University of Connecticut faculty
University of Virginia faculty
Year of birth missing (living people)
Living people